Sreepur is an upazila of Magura District in the Division of Khulna, Bangladesh. Sreepur thana was turned into an upazila in 1983.

History
It is reported that during the reign of the Pala king in the ninth century, it was an important city. At one time in the Sreepur region there was a king ruled by a "Virat Raja". His real name was Raja Ram Chandra. The king's wife's name was Sridevi. The upazila is named after Sridevi.

Geography
Sreepur upazila is located northeast of Magura district. Rajbari District to the north of the upazila, Shailkupa Upazila of Jhenaidah on the west, Magura Sadar Upazila on the south, Madhukhali Upazila. The Gorai River and the Kumar River are notable rivers of Sreepur.

Sreepur upazila has an area of 179.18 km2. Sreepur upazila is the smallest upazila in Magura district.

Demographics
Sreepur upazila has a population of 1 lakh 56 thousand 4 hundred 1. Of these, the men are 78 thousand 9 hundred 99 and women 77 thousand 4 hundred 2.

Administration
Sreepur Upazila is divided into eight union parishads: Amalsar, Dariapur, Gayeshpur, Kdir Para, Nakol, Sabdalpur, Sreekol, and Sreepur. The union parishads are subdivided into 83 mauzas and 164 villages.

Education
Rate of literacy is about 86%.
Number of Colleges:8;
Number of High Schools:25;
Number of Primary schools: more than 100.
Colleges: Sreepur Degree College, Dwariapur Shommilony College, Nakol Shommilony Degree College, Kamlapur GK Ideal Degree College,

High Schools: Sreepur M.C. Pilot Secondary School, Khamarpara High School, Sreekole Secondary High School, Radhanagor High School, Shomiloni High School, Nakol Raicharan High School, Tikerbila High School, Doran Nagor high School and Langolbandh High School, Nobogram High School. Chair MoheshPur  Secondary School, Barishat High School, Barishat purbapara dakhil madrasah

Notable residents 
 Kazi Kader Newaj (1909-1983) teacher and poet, born in Talibpur in the district of Murshidabad.He published several books of poems, among them Maral (1936), Dadur Baithak (1947), Nil Kumudi (1960), Duti Pakhi Duti Tara (1966), Manidvip, Utala Sandhya, Kaler Hawa, and Maruchandrika. He received the President's Award, Bangla Academy Award and Madar Baksh Award. Kazi Kader Newaj died in Jessore in 1983.
 Farrukh Ahmad (10 June 1918 – 19 October 1974) was a poet and writer of Bangladesh. He is commonly known as the 'Poet of the Muslim renaissance', as many of his poems embody the spirit of resurrection, particularly in the hearts of the down-trodden Muslims of the then Bengal.

See also
Upazilas of Bangladesh
Districts of Bangladesh
Divisions of Bangladesh

References 

Upazilas of Magura District
Magura District
Khulna Division